Lad Rymbai is a town in the East Jaintia Hills district of Meghalaya, India. It is a coal mining site, located along the National Highway 44.

History 

Lad Rymbai is Jaintia for "junction to the Rymbai village". Originally, a small village, it  emerged as a town with the completion of the National Highway 6, which made the village a transit point for vehicles operating between Guwahati and Silchar. The highway also made it possible for the businesses to exploit the local coal and limestone deposits, leading to the development of an unregulated mining industry.

Economy 

Lad Rymbai is an important market of the district, and is located at a distance of 30 km from Jowai.

Demographics 

The Pnar tribe are the native inhabitants of the village, which also attracts seasonal migrant coal workers from Bihar, Nepal and Bangladesh.

Administration 

Ladrymbai comes under the Khliehriat block and electoral constituency. The Ladrymbai post office serves the villages of Bataw, Mukhialong, Musniang, Rymbai, Sham Sham, Sohkhympher, Tuber Khamaishnong and Wapung.

References 

Cities and towns in East Jaintia Hills district